The 1926 Men's European Water Polo Championship was the 1st edition of the event,  organised by the Europe's governing body in aquatics, the Ligue Européenne de Natation. The event took place between 18 and 22 August in Budapest, Hungary as an integrated part of the 1926 European Aquatics Championships.

Teams

Main round

First round

Second round

Third round

Fourth round

Fifth round

Final ranking

István Barta, Tibor Fazekas, Márton Homonnai, Alajos Keserű, Ferenc Keserű, József Vértesy, János Wenk

References

External links
 European Water Polo Championships - Past and present results.
  Water Polo - Men's European Championships - 1926 – the-sports.org.

Men's European Water Polo Championship
E
W
International water polo competitions hosted by Hungary